Corte Alto is a town south of the city of Purranque in Osorno Province, south-central Chile. It lies about 1 km west of the Chile Route 5. The town had 1,774 inhabitants as of 2017.

References

Populated places in Osorno Province